William G. Mather (1857–1951) was an American industrialist. 

William G. Mather may also refer to:

 SS William G. Mather (1905), a lake freighter 1905–1996; renamed in 1925
 SS William G. Mather (1925), a lake freighter 1925–1980; currently a museum ship in Cleveland, Ohio